George Anton Kiraz (born 1965) is a Syriac engineer and entrepreneur, best known for his contribution to modern Syriac studies.

Biography 
George Kiraz was born in Bethlehem to a Syriac Orthodox merchant family which traces its roots back to Elazığ in Anatolia. He learned Syriac at Monastery of Saint Mark, Jerusalem. In 1983 he emigrated with his family to the United States where they settled in Los Angeles.

He holds numerous degrees including a B.Sc. degree in Engineering from California State University in 1990, a master's degree in Syriac Studies from University of Oxford in 1991, a master's degree in computer speech and language processing, and a Ph.D. degree in computational linguistics from University of Cambridge in 1992 and 1996 respectively.

In 1986, he designed the first computer fonts for Syriac and established a one-person company in Los Angeles named Alaph Beth Computer Systems for their distribution. He developed the proposal for encoding Syriac in Unicode (with Paul Nelson and Sargon Hasso) and designed the Unicode compliant Meltho fonts which enable Syriac computing on modern computers. His fonts are by far the most popular Computer Syriac fonts used in modern days.

He has been involved in Syriac related projects such as the co-founding of Gorgias Press, a publishing house dedicated to Syriac studies and other subjects in the humanities, and directing the institute of Beth Mardutho, which seeks to promote Syriac heritage and language.

Between 1996 and 2000, he worked at Bell Labs as a member of technical staff in the Language Modeling Group. Between 2000 and 2001 he was instrumental in opening an office for Nuance Communications on Wall Street, New York. His research interests include finite-state technology, computational morphology and phonology, and Syriac studies.

He is married to Christine Kiraz. They live with their three children in Piscataway, New Jersey.

Bibliography 
Kiraz has published a number of books about the Syriac language, and co-authored many others:

The Syriac primer: reading, writing, vocabulary & grammar: with exercises and cassette activities, 1988.
Computer-Generated Concordance to the Syriac New Testament, six volumes, 1993.
Lexical tools to the Syriac New Testament, 1994.
Anton Kiraz's archive on the Dead Sea scrolls, 2005.
The new Syriac primer: an introduction to the Syriac language with a CD, 2007.
Comparative Edition of the Syriac Gospels: Aligning the Old Syriac (Sinaiticus, Curetonianus), Peshitta and Harklean Versions, 2003.
The acts of Saint George and the story of his father: from the Syriac and Garshuni versions, 2009.
Introduction to Syriac Spirantization, Rukkâkâ and Quššâyâ (Losser, The Netherlands: Bar Hebraeus Verlag, 1995)
Computational Nonlinear Morphology, with Emphasis on Semitic Languages (Cambridge, U.K.: Cambridge University Press, 2002)
Syriac Alphabet for Children: Serto Edition (Piscataway, N.J.: Gorgias Press, 2004)
(With Sebastian P. Brock) Ephrem the Syrian: Select Poems: Vocalized Syriac text with English translation, introduction and notes (Utah: Brigham Young University Press, 2006)
Tūrāṣ Mamllā: A Grammar of the Syriac Language, Volume I: Syriac Orthography (Piscataway, N.J.: Gorgias Press, 2012)
(With Sebastian P. Brock, Aaron Butts, and Lucas Van Rompay) The Gorgias Encyclopedic Dictionary of the Syriac Heritage (Piscataway, N.J.: Gorgias Press, 2011)

He is directing the Antioch Bible project. As of 2014, he has published over 40 papers in the fields of computational linguistics and Syriac studies.

Ordinations 
Kiraz is a deacon in the Syriac Orthodox Church. He was consecrated and anointed a reader (Syriac Qoruyo) in Bethlehem on February 6, 1977, by the laying on of the hands of Mor Dioscoros Luqa Sha'ya, then Metropolitan of Jerusalem. He was ordained a sub-deacon by the late Mor Julius Yeshu Çiçek at St. Mark's Monastery on January 9, 1983. He was ordained a full deacon (Syriac Ewangeloyo) in Teaneck, NJ, by Mor Cyril Ephrem Karim on October 14, 2012.

He served in the following churches: St. Mary, Bethlehem (ca. 1973–1983), St. Mark’s Monastery, Jerusalem, and the Holy Sites (ca. 1979–1983), St. Ephrem, Los Angeles (1983–1990, 1996), St. Jacob Burd‛ono, London (1991–1996, sporadically), St. Mark’s Cathedral, Teaneck, NJ (1996–), and St. John bar Aphtonia, Cranbury, NJ (2003–).

Trivia 

 The word "Kiraz" means cherry in Turkish language.

References 

1965 births
Living people
Syriacists
People from Bethlehem
Palestinian people